Goose River Bridge may refer to:

Caledonia Bridge (Caledonia, North Dakota) or Goose River Bridge, a bridge in Traill County, North Dakota
Goose River Bridge (Hillsboro, North Dakota), a former bridge in Traill County, North Dakota
Northwood Bridge or Goose River Bridge, a bridge in Grand Forks County, North Dakota
Porter Elliott Bridge or Goose River Bridge, a bridge near Hillsboro, North Dakota
Portland Park Bridge or South Branch Goose River Bridge, a bridge near Portland, North Dakota
Viking Bridge or Goose River Bridge, a bridge near Portland, North Dakota

See also
 Goose River (disambiguation)